Muk Kiu Tau Tsuen is a walled village in Shap Pat Heung, Yuen Long District, in the New Territories of Hong Kong.

Recognised status
Muk Kiu Tau Tsuen is a recognised village under the New Territories Small House Policy.

Education
Muk Kiu Kau Tsuen is in Primary One Admission (POA) School Net 73. Within the school net are multiple aided schools (operated independently but funded with government money) and one government school: South Yuen Long Government Primary School (南元朗官立小學).

See also
 Walled villages of Hong Kong

References

External links

 Delineation of area of existing village Muk Kiu Tau (Shap Pat Heung) for election of resident representative (2019 to 2022)
 Antiquities Advisory Board. Historic Building Appraisal. Entrance Gate, Muk Kiu Tau Tsuen, Shap Pat Heung Picture

Walled villages of Hong Kong
Shap Pat Heung
Villages in Yuen Long District, Hong Kong